Ellen Banks (June 7, 1938 – May 18, 2017) was an American painter and multi-media artist using only printed musical scores as inspiration for her paintings.

Biography
Born in Boston, Banks spent her childhood exploring both painting and music and was inspired by Piet Mondrian. Banks received her bachelor's degree from the Massachusetts College of Art, studying also at the School of the Museum of Fine Arts. Her first solo exhibition took place in 1962. Only five years later, in 1967, she received the Prix de Paris, and her work has been widely exhibited. Since 1981 she has been using musical scores as the visual basis for her work.

Career
Banks began her career in 1962 with her first solo gallery. In addition to her formal education at the Massachusetts College of Art, Banks received training from César Domela and Hans Jaffé. She has drawn inspiration from only printed musical scores since 1981. She refers to herself as "a representational painter of abstracts forms", and her unique work has been featured in galleries across the United States and Europe including Galerie Spandow, Artu Gallery, and Museum of Modern Art (NYC). She taught painting courses at the School of the Museum of Fine Art in Boston (1974-1996), where she garnered a number of awards and grant funding. Banks has been based in Brooklyn for much of her career.

Notable works
Bovadra, 1975, Addison Gallery of American Art, Andover, Massachusetts
Scott Joplin, 1982, Addison Gallery of American Art, Andover, Massachusetts

References

1938 births
2017 deaths
American women painters
African-American women artists
20th-century American painters
20th-century American women artists
21st-century American painters
21st-century American women artists
Artists from Boston
Artists from Brooklyn
Painters from Massachusetts
Painters from New York City
Massachusetts College of Art and Design alumni
School of the Museum of Fine Arts at Tufts alumni
20th-century African-American women
20th-century African-American people
20th-century African-American painters
21st-century African-American women
21st-century African-American artists